Valdemar Skjerning (31 October 1887 – 19 August 1970) was a Danish stage and film actor.

Filmography
Kongen bød - 1938
Jens Langkniv (film) - 1940

External links

Danish male stage actors
Danish male film actors
20th-century Danish male actors
People from Faaborg-Midtfyn Municipality
1887 births
1970 deaths